West Park is a cricket ground in West Bridgford, Nottinghamshire.  The ground was constructed by cricket philanthropist Sir Julien Cahn. The first recorded match on the ground was in 1928, when Sir J Cahn's XI played the touring West Indies in a non first-class match.  In 1932 the ground held its first first-class match when Sir J Cahn's XI played the touring South Americans.  The ground held 2 further first-class matches, both of which came in 1935 when Sir J Cahn's XI played Leicestershire and Lancashire.  Sir J Cahn's XI last played at the ground in 1941 when they took on a British Empire XI.

Still in use, the ground is owned by Rushcliffe Borough Council.

References

External links
West Park on CricketArchive
West Park on Cricinfo

Cricket grounds in Nottinghamshire
Sports venues completed in 1928
1928 establishments in England
West Bridgford